Augustine Danglmayr (December 11, 1898 – September 18, 1992) was a bishop of the Catholic Church in the United States. He served as auxiliary bishop of the Diocese of Dallas from 1942 to 1969.

Biography
Born in Muenster, Texas, Danglmayr was educated at Subiaco Academy in Arkansas, Saint Mary Seminary in La Porte, Texas, and Kenrick Seminary near St. Louis, Missouri.  He was ordained a priest for the Diocese of Dallas on June 10, 1922.  Danglmayr was the vicar general of the diocese when on April 24, 1942 Pope Pius XII appointed him as the Titular Bishop of Olba and Auxiliary Bishop of Dallas.  He was consecrated a bishop by Archbishop Amleto Giovanni Cicognani, the Apostolic Delegate to the United States, on October 7, 1942. The principal co-consecrators were Bishop Joseph Patrick Lynch of Dallas and Auxiliary Bishop William David O'Brien of Chicago.  He continued to serve as an auxiliary bishop until his resignation was accepted by Pope Paul VI on August 22, 1969.  He died on September 18, 1992, at the age of 93.

References

1898 births
1992 deaths
People from Muenster, Texas
Kenrick–Glennon Seminary alumni
20th-century American Roman Catholic titular bishops
Catholics from Texas